The 1953 Giro di Lombardia cycling race took place on October 25, 1953, and was won by Fiorelli's Bruno Landi. It was the 47th edition of the Giro di Lombardia "monument" classic race.

General classification

References
El Sitio de Ciclismo

1953
1953 in road cycling
1953 in Italian sport
1953 Challenge Desgrange-Colombo